Mariana Rodrigues Mortágua (born 24 June 1986, in Alvito) is a Portuguese economist and politician. In 2013, she was elected to the Assembly of the Republic of Portugal, replacing Ana Drago. She is a member of the Bloco de Esquerda.

References

1986 births
Living people
Portuguese politicians
Left Bloc politicians